The Bill Chipman Palouse Trail is a paved rail trail in the northwestern United States, from Pullman, Washington, eastward to Moscow, Idaho. Completed  in 1998, it follows the former Union Pacific Railroad right-of-way and connects the rural university towns on the Palouse across the state border.

Route
From Pullman, the trail's  route gently climbs eastward along Paradise Creek, crossing it twelve times on original railroad bridges. The trail has two rest areas, three emergency phones, and multiple interpretive areas. It is south of and parallel to State Route 270, the Moscow-Pullman Highway, which becomes State Highway 8 in Idaho. The BCPT is not only a recreational facility, but also a commuter route that connects the land-grant campuses of the University of Idaho and Washington State University.

Trail connections
The Bill Chipman Palouse Trail ends  into Idaho at the UI's Perimeter Road, but the trail continues eastward. It connects with the Paradise Path, which spans  through the north and east edges of the UI campus and to the east edge of the Moscow city limits, where it seamlessly connects with the Latah Trail at Carmichael Road.

Completed in October 2008, the  trail was paved in stages over a six-year period. It parallels Highway 8, the Troy Highway, for most of its length, separating to the north a few miles outside of Troy.

History

After 12 years of community efforts and donations, along with agency cooperation, the Bill Chipman Palouse Trail was dedicated on April 4, 1998. It is part of the federal Rails to Trails program, which preserves railroad corridors for non-motorized transportation and possible future transportation use. It is open dawn to dusk year round – day use only – and to all ages and abilities. The trail is maintained and managed by a coalition of park and trail representatives from Whitman County, the City of Pullman, the City of Moscow, the University of Idaho, and Washington State University. With non-motorized traffic transferred to the BCPT, the highway was later improved and widened to five lanes (two lanes in each direction with a center dividing lane), completed in spring 2008.

The extended time frame for completion was because the railroad was not yet abandoned. Two rail lines ran between Moscow and Pullman and the issue was which to consolidate upon. The former U.P. line, operated by the Palouse River Railroad, ran along Paradise Creek, south of and parallel to Highway 270. Further south, the BNSF line arcs southwest from the state line to follow Sunshine Creek and then the old highway to Pullman Junction. When it was agreed that the BNSF route would remain, the old U.P. route was removed, beginning in October 1996.

The U.P. line between the cities was first constructed in 1885 as the Columbia and Palouse Railroad, which later became part of the Oregon Railroad and Navigation Company.

References

External links
Trail Link.com - Bill Chipman Palouse Trail
Trails.com - Bill Chipman Palouse Trail

Rail trails in Washington (state)
Rail trails in Idaho
Protected areas of Whitman County, Washington
Protected areas of Latah County, Idaho
Transportation in Whitman County, Washington
Tourist attractions in Latah County, Idaho
Tourist attractions in Whitman County, Washington
Moscow, Idaho
Pullman, Washington
1998 establishments in Idaho
1998 establishments in Washington (state)